Trond Heggestad (born 3 January 1978) is a retired Norwegian football striker.

In 1996 he played for Balestrand in the Seventh Division, the eighth tier of Norwegian football, before joining Sogndal's youth system in 1997. From 1998 he played for the senior team, albeit without league goals. Following an unsuccessful spell in Viking, he played in Bergen for Åsane and Løv-Ham before settling in Austevoll IK.

References

1978 births
Living people
People from Balestrand
Norwegian footballers
Sogndal Fotball players
Viking FK players
Åsane Fotball players
Løv-Ham Fotball players
Eliteserien players
Norwegian First Division players
Association football forwards
Sportspeople from Vestland